According to Eastern Christian tradition, Addai of Edessa (Syriac: ܡܪܝ ܐܕܝ, Mar Addai or Mor Aday sometimes Latinized Addeus) or Thaddeus of Edessa was one of the seventy disciples of Jesus. He is possibly identical with Thaddaeus, one of the Twelve Apostles. From an early date his hagiography is filled with legends and fabrications. The saint himself may be entirely fictitious.

Life

Based on various Eastern Christian traditions, Thaddaeus was a Jew born in Edessa, at the time a Syriac city, (now Şanlıurfa, Turkey). He came to Jerusalem for a festival, and heard the preachings of John the Baptist (St. John the Forerunner). After being baptized by John the Baptist in the Jordan River, he remained in Palestine. He later met and became a follower of Jesus. He was chosen to be one of the seventy disciples, whom Jesus sent in pairs to preach in the cities and places.

After Pentecost and the ascension of Jesus, Thaddeus started preaching the gospel in Mesopotamia, Syria and Persia. Thaddaeus ordained priests in Edessa, converted many to Christianity and built up the church there. He also went to Beirut to preach, and many believe that he founded a church there.

The Syriac liturgy referred to as the Liturgy of Addai and Mari originated around the year 200 AD and is used by the Assyrian Church of the East and the Chaldean Catholic Church (both of which are based in Iraq); it is also used by the Eastern Syriac Churches in India which trace their origins to Thomas the Apostle, namely, the Chaldean Syrian Church and Syro-Malabar Catholic Church .

His feast is celebrated on August 5 in the Christian calendar.

Addai and the healing of King Abgar

Among the Eastern Orthodox faithful, Saint Addai was a disciple of Christ sent by St. Thomas the Apostle to Edessa in order to heal King Abgar V of Osroene, who had fallen ill. He stayed to evangelize, and so converted Abgar—or Agbar, or in one Latin version "Acbar" — and his people including Saint Aggai and Saint Mari.

The story of how King Abgarus V and Jesus had corresponded was first recounted in the 4th century by the church historian Eusebius of Caesarea. In the origin of the legend, Eusebius had been shown documents purporting to contain the official correspondence that passed between Abgar and Jesus, and he was well enough convinced by their authenticity to quote them extensively in his Ecclesiastical History. According to Eusebius:

The story of the healing and Thaddeus' evangelizing efforts resulted in the growing of Christian communities in southern Armenia, northern Mesopotamia and in Syria east of Antioch. Thaddeus' story is embodied in the Syriac document, Doctrine of Addai, which recounts the role of Addai and makes him one of the 72 Apostles sent out to spread the Christian faith. By the time the legend had returned to Syria, the purported site of the miraculous image, it had been embroidered into a tissue of miraculous happenings. The story was retold in elaborated form by Ephrem the Syrian.

Various traditions
St. Addai also appears in the First Apocalypse of James and the Second Apocalypse of James.

In Roman Catholic tradition, he and Saint Mari are considered patrons of Persian and Assyrian people.

References

External links
Thomasine Church Patriarchs
 Saints Index: Sts. Addai & Mari
 Catholic Encyclopedia: The Legend of Abgar
 Catholic Encyclopedia: The Liturgy of Sts. Addeus and Maris
 Catholic Encyclopedia: Doctrine of St. Addai
 Syriac Orthodox: Doctrine of St. Addai  - online text in English
 Thaddeus, Apostle of the Seventy - further Information

1st-century births
2nd-century deaths
1st-century bishops
2nd-century Mesopotamian bishops
2nd-century Christian saints
Year of birth missing
Year of death missing
Ancient apocalypticists
Assyrian Church of the East saints
Bishops of Edessa
Christian hagiography
Early Jewish Christians
Patriarchs of the Church of the East
Persian saints
1st-century Jews
Saints from Roman Syria
Seventy disciples
Syriac Christianity